Edge-On is an adventure published by Iron Crown Enterprises (ICE) in 1990 for the near-future science fiction role-playing game Cyberspace.

Description
Edge-On includes four unrelated scenarios for Cyberspace:
 "Network 69 takes the fall": The player-characters are hired by media firm Channel 32 to steal data on future programs from rival Channel 69.
 "Ward, I'm Worried": The player-characters are hired by a mega-corporation to find a missing scientist, bringing them in contact with the Fusers gang in the slums of San Francisco, and the Fusers' cybernetic leader.
 "Safety Violation": The player-characters are hired by Okira Corporation to sabotage an oil rig owned by rival New Edison. After they start the explosives' timers, an earthquake cuts off their line of escape.
 "Unscheduled Layover": During a courier mission, the player-characters' shuttle crashes in the Amazon rainforest, and they discover an ancient Mayan city transformed into a secret base.

The book also includes guidelines showing how to link the scenarios to one another.

Publication history
ICE first published Cyberspace in 1989. The game's first supplement, Edge-On, subtitled Cyberventure Mission File #1, was published the following year, a 48-page softcover book written by Terry Amthor, with interior art by Kevin Barrett, Angela Bostick, Dell Harris, Rick Lowry, and Chuck Muchowa, and cover art by Janet Aulisio-Dannheiser.

Reviews
White Wolf #21 (June/July, 1990)
Games Review June 1990 (Vol. 2, Issue 9, p. 60)

References

Cyberspace (role-playing game)
Role-playing game supplements introduced in 1990
Science fiction role-playing game adventures